Capital University (Capital, Cap, or CU) is a private university in Bexley, Ohio. Capital was founded as the Theological Seminary of the Evangelical Lutheran Synod of Ohio in 1830, and later was associated with that synod's successor, the American Lutheran Church. The university has undergraduate and graduate programs, as well as a law school. Capital University is the oldest university in Central Ohio and is one of the oldest and largest Lutheran-affiliated universities in North America.

History
Capital University was founded on June 3, 1830, as the Theological Seminary of the Evangelical Lutheran Synod of Ohio in Canton, Ohio, 40 years before the founding of Ohio State University, making it the oldest university in Central Ohio. It moved to downtown Columbus in 1832. On March 2, 1850, The non-seminary portion of the school was renamed Capital University and the seminary was renamed the Evangelical Lutheran Theological Seminary (ELTS). At that time the denomination was renamed to the Evangelical Lutheran Joint Synod of Ohio and Other States and grew into a nationwide church body. The first president of the renamed university was William Morton Reynolds.

In 1930, the Joint Synod was merged with two other smaller German language groups, the Iowa Synod (formed 1854) and the Buffalo Synod (founded 1845) to create the American Lutheran Church (ALC), headquartered in Columbus. The ALC existed only three decades, until 1960, when it in turn participated in a larger merger with the Evangelical Lutheran Church and the United Evangelical Lutheran Church Danish to form The American Lutheran Church. The second ALC lasted until the formation of the current Evangelical Lutheran Church in America (ELCA) in 1988, with offices in Chicago, Illinois.

The university eventually moved its main campus to the rural periphery of the state capital in the community of Bexley. This rural area has since developed into an upscale suburb. Capital University's educational mission is based on Lutheran values of free inquiry, critical thinking, and leadership. A current motto used at the school is "Ask. Think. Lead", a continuing reminder of its educational mission.

In recognition of several buildings' historic architectural merit,a portion of the campus was entered on the National Register of Historic Places as the "Capital University Historic District" in 1982. The district comprises Mees Hall, Bexley Hall, the Kerns Religious Life Center (formerly Rudolph Hall), and Leonard Hall. The district originally also included Lehmann Hall and Loy Hall, but those two buildings have since been demolished.

In May 2004, the university received approval to close Mound Street between College Avenue and Pleasant Ridge Avenue from the city of Bexley. In 2006, the university constructed a pedestrian mall on the closed portion of Mound Street which included parking, improved lighting, benches, and landscaping. The $2.5 million project unified the northern and southern portions of campus.

Denvy A. Bowman, the university's 15th president retired on July 1, 2016, ending his ten-year tenure as president. On February 9, 2016, Elizabeth L. Paul was named as the 16th president of Capital and was the first woman to hold the position at the university; she subsequently resigned in 2020. David Kaufman became interim president in June 2020 and was named the 17th president on July 25, 2021.

ELTS became independent of the university in 1959. It merged with the theological department known as Hamma Divinity School of nearby Wittenberg University in Springfield, Ohio, in 1978, and reopened on the Bexley campus as Trinity Lutheran Seminary, where it continues today as a theological seminary of the ELCA. In the fall of 2016, Capital University and Trinity Lutheran Seminary announced that the two would reunite after 58 years of operating separately. The goal was to have the reunion plan completed by summer of 2017 with implementation to follow over the next two years.

On July 13, 2020, the university Board of Trustees announced plans to retire the Crusader nickname and the “Cappy” mascot following a 15-month long study. The university formally adopted “Capital Comets” as the new mascot name on September 30, 2021.

Academics
Capital is accredited by the Higher Learning Commission. It has more than 60 majors and 51 minors to choose from.

The academic buildings on campus include Battelle Hall, Ruff Learning Center, Troutman Hall, Kerns Religious Life Center, Huber-Spielman Hall, Conservatory of Music, and Renner Hall.

Capital University's ranking in the 2022 U.S. News & World Report edition of Best Colleges is Regional Universities Midwest, tied at #37.

Law School

Capital University Law School is an ABA-accredited private law school located in downtown Columbus. U.S. News & World Report listed Capital's full-time Juris Doctor program as "Rank Not Published" in 2018, but in 2022 it was ranked as tied for No. 147-193 out of 197 schools in Best Law Schools.

Campus life

Student organizations
Capital University features more than 70 student organizations. This includes 13 fraternities and sororities, arts and media organizations, cultural organizations, honors societies, campus programming, religious organizations, service organizations, and government and social organizations. Some examples include Pride, PRSSA, Circle K, Jewish Student Association, ReCap Literary Magazine, the Chimes (student news), intramural sports, student government, and numerous music organizations in which both non-music and music majors can perform.

Residence life
Capital is a residential campus that operates on semester scheduling. Most students live on campus in one of seven residence halls: Saylor-Ackermann Hall, Cotterman Hall, the Lohman Complex (comprising several residence halls), Schaaf Hall, Capital Commons, College Avenue Hall, and the Capital University Apartments (formerly the Woodsview Apartments).

Music
Capital University's music program is well-respected in the music community. Consisting of traditional and contemporary tracks, legendary faculty member Ray Eubanks started the jazz program and the music industry programs, which were some of the first in the nation. The largest degree concentration within the Conservatory is the Music Technology program, consisting of two tracks authored by Dr. Rocky J. Reuter, who also created the composition degree, the MIDI Band (an all-electronic live ensemble that has toured throughout the mid-west and eastern US), Ensemble Now (an improvisational-based contemporary music ensemble) and NOW MUSIC Festival, an annual celebration of contemporary music. The Chapel Choir has performed around Ohio and the world, including Carnegie Hall. The annual Christmas Festival at Capital, led by all the choral ensembles (the Capital Chordsmen, Women's Chorus, Choral Union, and Chapel Choir), is a popular local event and community institution. Recently, the university appointed its first female Assistant Dean of the Conservatory of Music.

WXCU Radio

The campus radio station, WXCU Radio, is entirely student-run and managed. Starting in 2007, the radio station began streaming online only with an alternative and indie rock format. Students have the opportunity to host their own radio show and interview nationally touring acts. Additionally, the station hosts several concerts and also supports the efforts of other groups campus-wide. Participation can be either extra-curricular, or for credits. The station takes music submissions and frequently features music produced by students.

Harry C. Moores Student Union
During the summer of 2013 the Harry C. Moores Campus Center underwent a multimillion-dollar renovation. Capital University's Student Government rededicated the building as the 'Harry C. Moores Student Union' in the fall of 2013. Capital's Barnes & Noble bookstore is located on the first floor of the Union . The Student Union is also home to the campus mail room and the main dining facilities for Capital University.

The main dining room (MDR) or "Capital Court" on campus underwent renovations during the summer of 2015.

The bookstore on the first floor of the student union underwent renovations during the summer of 2016.

The third floor of the student union underwent renovations during the fall of 2016 to install a new workout area on campus. The workout facility opened in January 2017. The third floor used to have a lounge and game tables; it was also home to the 'Mezz' dining option however that option was closed in 2015.

Blackmore Library
The Capital University Blackmore Library is a four-floor structure. Computers are located on the first three floors for use, with only one on the third floor. The third floor contains many articles and much of the university's historic data is located there. The fourth floor is the home to the Schumacher Gallery, which houses a large art collection on campus. The second floor has a large collection of music, including a vinyl section. Constructed in 1969 and dedicated in March 1971, the library now contains more than 300,000 articles of media. The library was named in 1998 for Josiah Blackmore, a well-known legal scholar and former president of the university. The first and second floors of Blackmore Library were renovated in Summer 2012.

Schumacher Gallery
Schumacher Gallery houses the 502-piece Schreiber-Fox Collection of African Art. Schreiber and Fox donated their collection of African art to Capital University. The Schumacher Gallery's permanent collections consist of a diverse selection of more than 2500 works of art for education and enjoyment.

A piece of the Berlin Wall is a popular attraction for visitors and incoming students. Obtained in 1992, the wall was given on long-term loan from Hansa Consulting, a German-based corporation. On one side is colorful graffiti written during the separation of East and West Berlin, while the other side is blank concrete revealing a few bullet holes, evidence of the confinement of East Berliners. Once housed in the university's library, the structure now stands outside behind Huber-Spielman Hall. The concrete wall weighs 2.8 tons.

Convergent Media Center 
The three-story Convergent Media Center is designed to facilitate interdisciplinary work. The lower level contains a professional recording studio and digital art and design laboratories. 

A television and a radio studio on the first floor allow training for video production and for radio, television, film, visual, technical, and performing arts. The first floor also houses the student radio station, WXCU, and studios and the control room for CapTV, along with event space for student publications.

The second level houses faculty offices, small conference rooms, and seminar classrooms.

Athletics

Capital University participates in numerous intercollegiate sports as a member Ohio Athletic Conference (OAC) at the NCAA Division III level. The school's primary athletic rival is the Otterbein Cardinals of Westerville, Ohio. Capital's teams have been known as the Comets since September 2021, when the name was changed from the Crusaders. In the 1930s, the school's teams were called the Fighting Lutherans. The following teams and clubs compete on the varsity level:

Men's sports
 Baseball
 Basketball
 Cross country
 Football
 Golf
 Soccer
 Tennis
 Track and field (indoor and outdoor)
 Lacrosse

Women's sports
Basketball
 Cross country
 Golf
 Soccer
 Softball
 Tennis
 Track and field (indoor and outdoor)
 Volleyball
 Lacrosse

Intramural sports
 Basketball
 Dodgeball
 Volleyball
 Flag football
 Ultimate frisbee
 Racquetball
 Soccer
 Softball
 Zumba

National championships
Capital University became the first school to win back-to-back NCAA Division III Women's Basketball National Championships in 1994 and 1995. The two championships highlight a five-year run that featured four trips to the national semifinals and finals. The Crusaders finished second in the nation in 1993 and third in the nation in 1997.

Bernlohr Stadium
Bernlohr Stadium is home to the football team, men's and women's soccer teams, track team, and also to the men's and women's lacrosse teams. In 2011, Field turf was reinstalled to the field. The stadium does have a three lane track. The capacity is around 3,000 with seating and standing room. In fall of 2012, a new HD LCD scoreboard was revealed. In October 2014, Capital was granted permission to install stadium lights and a new sound system at the stadium by the Bexley Planning Commission. This decision was upheld in January 2015, by the Bexley City Council after residents living near the stadium appealed the planning commission's decision.

In the fall of 2016, alumnus Wells Purmort (class of 1958) made a donation to the university's athletic department. Purmort gave a gift of $1 million which will be used to maintain the turf at the stadium as well as be used for the eventual replacement of the field. To show its appreciation, the university named the playing surface after him. The stadium is now known as Purmort Field at Bernlohr Stadium.

Capital Center
The Capital Center is a 126,000-square-foot recreational and athletic complex opened in 2001. Located inside is a weight room and cardio workout area open to students. The facility has an indoor track as well. The basketball teams and the volleyball team use the main gym inside the complex for their home games. Some classes are also held inside the Capital Center. The Capital Center is connected to Bernlor Stadium.

Clowson Field
Clowson Field is home to the baseball and softball teams. The field is located just a short drive from campus off of South Nelson Road. In 2021, a project to bring the softball and baseball fields to the main campus using space south of the Student Union was being considered.

People

Capital has many alumni living in central Ohio and throughout the United States.

See also
Capital University Law School

References

External links

 
Private universities and colleges in Ohio
Liberal arts colleges at universities in the United States
Educational institutions established in 1830
Universities and colleges affiliated with the Evangelical Lutheran Church in America
Universities and colleges in Franklin County, Ohio
Bexley, Ohio
1830 establishments in Ohio
National Register of Historic Places in Franklin County, Ohio
Historic districts on the National Register of Historic Places in Ohio
Historic districts in Franklin County, Ohio